Elm Park, also known as Clocktower Park, is a historic park near the junction of Massachusetts Route 16 and Massachusetts Route 9 in the Wellesley Hills section of Wellesley, Massachusetts. Its focal point is the  brick and masonry Sprague Tower, designed by Benjamin Proctor, Jr., and built in 1928 to house a clock and bell given to the town in 1874. A portion of the now-defunct Cochituate Aqueduct passes through the park. Land for the park was acquired in 1908 by the town with funds raised by the community; the clock and bell were the gift of John Shaw. Isaac Sprague, for whom the tower is named, sat on the committee which oversaw its construction, and donated materials for that purpose.

The park was listed on the National Register of Historic Places in 2007.

See also
National Register of Historic Places listings in Norfolk County, Massachusetts

References

Monuments and memorials on the National Register of Historic Places in Massachusetts
Wellesley, Massachusetts
Buildings and structures in Norfolk County, Massachusetts
Towers in Massachusetts
Parks in Massachusetts
National Register of Historic Places in Norfolk County, Massachusetts